Nico de Haas (Amsterdam, 23 June 1907 – 1995) was a Dutch National-Socialist photographer, graphic designer, and artist.

During the German occupation of the Netherlands, he was responsible for the design of the Dutch coins and paper money. He was also the chief editor of the weekly magazine of the Nederlandsche SS, called Storm during two periods i.e. from April 1941 until December 1942 and from September 1944 until May 1945.

References
Dutch language article Nico de Haas on the Dutch language Wikipedia,  version 11 November 2006 that in turn cites the following Dutch language sources
Bogaard, Frank van den Een stoottroep in de letteren, 'Groot Nederland', de SS en de Nederlandse literatuur (1942–1944). Stichting Bibliographia Neerlandica, 's-Gravenhage, 1987. .
Groeneveld, Gerard Kriegsberichter, Nederlandse SS-oorlogsverslaggevers 1941–1945. Uitgeverij Vantilt, Nijmegen, 2004, pp. 305–317. 
Groeneveld, Gerard Zwaard van de geest, het bruine boek in Nederland 1921–1945. Uitgeverij Vantilt, Nijmegen, 2001. .

See also
1 cent WWII (Dutch coin)
10 cents (World War II Dutch coin)
25 cents (World War II Dutch coin)

Dutch currency designers
1907 births
1995 deaths
Artists from Amsterdam
Dutch graphic designers
20th-century Dutch photographers